George Henry Atkinson II (born January 4, 1947) is an American former professional football player who was a safety and kick returner in the American Football League (AFL) and National Football League (NFL) for the Oakland Raiders from 1968 to 1977. He played college football at Morris Brown. He was a member of the Raiders' Super Bowl XI championship team.

Playing career
Atkinson started his career in 1968 with the Raiders as a cornerback / kick returner. In fact, his first ever game as a professional player. Facing the Buffalo Bills on September 15, he scored the first touchdown of the game on a punt return for 86 yards. He returned five total punts during the game for 205 yards (along with one kick for 25 yards) in the win. On offense for the season, he returned 36 punts for 490 yards and two touchdowns (all AFL highs) while returning 32 kicks for 802 yards. On defense, he picked four passes off for 66 yards and a touchdown. He would do returns on and off for the next seven years to go with his defense, although never as much as before; he returned 112 punts and 44 kicks combined in the years after 1968 for one total touchdown and 2,323 yards.

He made the Pro Bowl that year along with the following season. In that one, he had two interceptions along with one for a touchdown. He would average around three interceptions in every season he played, having as many as 4 (1971, 1972, 1974–1975) and as little as 2 (1969, 1977). He ranks fifth on the Raiders all-time interception list with 30.

In a regular-season game in 1976 vs. the Pittsburgh Steelers, the Raiders' arch-rival, Atkinson hit an unsuspecting Lynn Swann in the back of the head with a forearm smash, even though the ball had not been thrown to Swann. The hit rendered Swann unconscious with a concussion. Atkinson had also hit Swann in a similar manner in the previous season's AFC Championship game, which also gave Swann a concussion. After the second incident, Steelers' coach Chuck Noll referred to Atkinson as part of the "criminal element" in football. Atkinson subsequently filed a $2 million defamation lawsuit against Noll and the Steelers, which Atkinson lost.

Broadcasting career
Atkinson currently works as a Raiders broadcaster, doing the pre-game and post-game shows.  He also hosts a television program called Behind the Shield.  Since 2008, Atkinson has been a major spokesperson for "The Clothing Broker", a warehouse-style clothing store in Oakland, California. He also appears regularly on NFL Network "Top 10" shows that involve the Raiders, providing insight and his perspective on the many "controversial" calls made against the Oakland Raiders.  Some examples are: 1) Perhaps the most controversial call - the Immaculate Reception - Atkinson contends that it was a dead ball because of the "double touch" rule (i.e., a Steelers player came into contact with the football while the pass was in the air), that the football also touched the ground before being scooped up by Steelers' Franco Harris and thus the play should have been ruled as an incomplete pass, and because Raiders' linebacker, Phil Villapiano, was illegally blocked ("clipped") during Harris's resulting game clinching touchdown run;  2) Atkinson stated that the Tuck Rule had never been used until it was used against the Raiders in the 2001 AFC divisional playoff game (it actually came into play during an earlier game, also involving the Patriots, that same 2001 season) and never used again (the Tuck Rule was abolished on March 20, 2013).

Personal life
Atkinson's twin sons George III and Josh played college football for Notre Dame. George III became an NFL running back. Both George III and Josh died prematurely; Josh killed himself in December 2018, and George III died of unannounced causes (following a suicide attempt shortly after Josh's death) in December 2019.

Atkinson's former significant other, the mother of George III and Josh, herself had severe mental illness and was institutionalized during the twins' childhood. She died in fall 2018, shortly before Josh died, of complications of Crohn's disease.

See also
 List of American Football League players
 List of family relations in American football

References

1947 births
Living people
American football safeties
American Football League All-Star players
American Football League players
American sports announcers
Denver Broncos players
Morris Brown Wolverines football players
Oakland Raiders players
Players of American football from Savannah, Georgia